Robert Steven Barclay FRSE (13 September 1901 – 20 March 1973) was a Scottish statistician, noted as a scholar of Orkney.

Life
Barclay was born at Hurkisgarth, in Sandwick, on the Mainland of Orkney, to Margaret (née Manson) and Charles Noble Barclay. He was educated at Oxtro School, in Birsay, George Heriot's School, in Edinburgh, and the University of Edinburgh (BSc; PhD 1947).

Barclay served as an Ordinary Seaman in the Merchant Service from 1929 to 1933. During World War II he served as Lieutenant in the Royal Naval Reserve.

In 1949, he married Anne Moodie. In the same year, he was elected a Fellow of the Royal Society of Edinburgh. His proposers were William O. Kermack, Alexander Aitken, Frank Fraser Darling, James G. Kydd and J. B. de Winton Moloney. From 1949 to 1969 he was on the staff of Register House, Edinburgh.

Barclay died in Edinburgh on 20 March 1973.

References

1901 births
1973 deaths
People from Orkney
People educated at George Heriot's School
Alumni of the University of Edinburgh
Fellows of the Royal Society of Edinburgh
British Merchant Navy personnel
Royal Naval Volunteer Reserve personnel of World War II
Scottish archivists
British demographers
Historians of Scotland
Scottish sailors
Scottish statisticians
20th-century Scottish historians
Royal Navy officers of World War II
Royal Naval Reserve personnel